Governor Whitcomb may refer to:

Edgar Whitcomb, 43rd Governor of Indiana
James Whitcomb, 8th Governor of Indiana